Kyotera District is a district in the Central Region of Uganda.   Kyotera is the largest town in the district but the district headquarters are located at Kasaali, a suburb of Kyotera.

Location
The districts that surround Kyotera District include Rakai District, Lwengo District, Kalangala District and Masaka District. Directly south of the new district is the Missenyi District in the Kagera Region of Tanzania. Kasaali, the location of the district headquarters, is a suburb of Kyotera, the largest town n the district.

Overview
Created by in 2015, by Act of Parliament, Kyotera District became functional on 1 July 2017. Before that, it was part of the Rakai District. The new district comprises two counties of Kakuuto and Kyotera. The rationale given for the creation of the new district is "to bring government services closer to the people" and "improve service delivery".

See also
 Districts of Uganda

References

External links
The Old Rakai District Water Supply Map

 
Districts of Uganda
Central Region, Uganda